Michael Jantze is an American cartoonist and illustrator, best known as the author of the syndicated newspaper comic strip The Norm . Born in Middletown, New York, he grew up in Normal, Illinois. He now lives in Seattle, Washington.

He attended Goshen College and California State University, Northridge, then worked as an art director, first in corporations and newspaper newsrooms and then at ILM, while developing his strip. He taught animation and sequential art at the Savannah College of Art and Design from 2009 to 2013.

In addition to the comic strip, Jantze owned Jantze Studios, LLC, a studio focusing on character-based humorous entertainment for print and animation; clients included Joe Murray Studios, Fox Sports, LXR Resorts and Hotels, Hearst Media, and YouTube. Jantze Studios closed in 2016 when Michael went to Amazon Publishing.

References

External links
Jantze web site
Michael Jantze's archived comic strip The Norm
2010 Nickel's Worth Interview
2011 Talltale Radio Interview
2013 Talltale Radio Interview

American comic strip cartoonists
1962 births
Living people
People from Middletown, Orange County, New York
People from Normal, Illinois
People from Ross, California